"Part Time Love" is a 1963 R&B song written by Clay Hammond and first recorded by Little Johnny Taylor. It was his second release and his most successful on the US Billboard R&B chart.  "Part Time Love" was number one on that chart for one week, and was also Taylor's only top 40 entry, reaching number 19.

Cover versions
Ann Peebles recorded a version in 1970, which reached number seven on the R&B chart and number 45 on the Billboard Hot 100 chart. 
Isaac Hayes recorded an 8:30 version for his 1971 double album, Black Moses.

References

1963 singles
Blues songs
1963 songs